Battle of Rawa (also written as -Rava, -Rawa-Ruska, -Rava-Ruska, or -Rava-Russka) was an early stage World War I battle between Austria-Hungary and Russia, between September 3–11, 1914. The Russian armies had defeated their opponents and threw them back to the Carpathian mountains. The battle was part of the series of engagements known as Battle of Galicia.

Background
According to Prit Buttar, "Conrad issued further orders to prepare for what he hoped would be a decisive blow by Auffenberg's Fourth Army.  Leaving only four infantry divisions and two cavalry divisions facing north, under the collective command of Archduke Joseph Ferdinand, Auffenberg was to turn and march southeast.  Meanwhile, Ivanov finally prevailed upon Ruzsky to turn northwest, so that he could march to the aid of Plehve's army.  Unwittingly, the Russians and Austro-Hungarians thus created the circumstances that would lead to a head-on collision between Auffenberg's Fourth Army and Ruzsky's Third Army."  Auffenberg's IX, VI, and XVII Corps were located between Niemirów and Rawa Ruska.  The Russian Third Army consisted of the IX, X, XI, and XXI Corps.  On 6 September, the Austro-Hungarian XVII and VI Corps met the Russian IX and X Corps respectively, while the Russian XXI Corps extended beyond the left flank of the Austro-Hungarians.  At the same time, Plehve's Fifth Army advanced to the south.  Joseph Ferdinand now faced the Russian XXI Corps to the east, the Russian Fifth Army to the north, while the Austro-Hungarian First Army retreated towards the south.  Protecting the Austro-Hungarian Fourth army's rear, Joseph Ferdinand located his men north of Rawa Ruska.

Battle
On 8 September, fighting continued along Auffenberg's front, as the Austro-Hungarian Fourth Army was in danger of being surrounded. Outnumbered two to one, the Austro-Hungarians continued to resist Russian advances, especially along Auffenberg's exposed northern flank.  Joseph Ferdinand had only one division to block Plehve's Russian V and XVII Corps, advancing from Komarów.  On 9 September, Auffenberg started his retreat westwards towards the River San.

Aftermath
The Austro-Hungarian armies did not stop at the River San, instead retreating to the Dunajec and Biala Rivers, abandoning the Przemyśl Fortress to a Russian siege.  On 29 September, Auffenberg received a letter from Archduke Frederick stating, "...I call upon you to give to your Fatherland the greatest sacrifice that a soldier can be asked to make, that is, to report sick and to resign the command of the Fourth Army."

References

Additional Reading
 Nicholas Golovin. "The Great Battle of Galicia, 1914: a Study in Strategy". Slavonic Review, vol. 5, 1926–27. (online: The Great Battle of Galicia - A study in strategy )
 Map of the Battle of Rawa
 Rickard, J. (23 February 2001), Battle of Rava Ruska, 3-11 September 1914

Battles of the Eastern Front (World War I)
Battles of World War I involving Austria-Hungary
Battles of World War I involving Russia
1914 in the Russian Empire